Sunset is a locality immediately to the east of the town of Kington, Herefordshire in England.

It is bordered by the River Arrow.

External links

Hamlets in Herefordshire